The 2011 Pokka GT Summer Special was the fifth round of the 2011 Super GT season and despite the race being shortened to 500km following the 2011 Tōhoku earthquake and tsunami, this was the 40th running of the 1000 km Suzuka event. It took place on August 21, 2011.

Race results
Results are as follows:

Note: The race ended after 86 of the scheduled 87 laps due to reaching the time limit of 6:30pm. Full points were awarded in Super GT rankings.

Statistics
GT500 Pole Position – #46 MOLA GT-R – 2:08.206
GT300 Pole Position – #43 ARTA Garaiya – 2:20.696
GT500 Fastest Lap – #46 MOLA GT-R – 1:59.923
GT300 Fastest Lap – #62 R&D Sport Subaru – 2:09.877
Winner's Race Time – 3:16:09.255

References

Pokka GT Summer Special